The Aurora, Elgin & Fox River Electric (AE&FRE), was an interurban railroad that operated freight and passenger service on its line paralleling the Fox River. It served the communities of Carpentersville, Dundee, Elgin, South Elgin, St. Charles,  Geneva, Batavia, North Aurora, Aurora, Montgomery, and Yorkville in Illinois. It also operated local streetcar lines in both Aurora and Elgin.

History

Predecessor companies opened service in 1895 between Carpentersville and Elgin; in 1896 between Elgin and St. Charles and Aurora and Geneva; in 1899 between Aurora and Yorkville; and in 1901 between St. Charles and Geneva.  In the era 1901-1906 it was known as the Elgin, Aurora & Southern Traction Company.

The EA&S merged with the Aurora Elgin & Chicago Railway in 1906 and became the new Aurora Elgin & Chicago Railroad's Fox River Division. The company was separated by order of the U.S. Bankruptcy Court in 1923, when the Fox River Division assumed the AE&FRE name, and the rest of the AE&C (the Third Rail Division) became the Chicago Aurora and Elgin Railroad.

Service typically operated on one-hour headways between Elgin and Aurora, with connecting service between Carpentersville and Elgin, and between Aurora and Montgomery.

Passenger service ended March 31, 1935, except on a short stretch of track used by the CA&E in St. Charles and Geneva, where passenger service ended December 31, 1937. Freight service continued on a  stretch of the line between Coleman Yard and the Elgin State Hospital under electric power until 1947, and by diesel until 1972. At that time, the remnant of the line was sold to its current museum operators. Rail remaining between the current museum site in South Elgin and the State Hospital was removed in 1978.

    
Today much of the railroad’s former right of way is now a bicycle path known as the Fox River Trail. The Fox River Trolley Museum in South Elgin operates over a preserved section of its right of way.

Trackage

Elgin and Aurora streetcar systems
By 1900 both Elgin and Aurora had electric streetcars on lines radiating out from downtown. Elgin had  of track, the downtown area was double tracked in the 1920s. Aurora had , with double track in most of the downtown area by 1900. Aurora’s lines were often “through routes”, entering downtown on one line and exiting on another.

Since 31 March 1935, when rail passenger service was discontinued, routes in Aurora have changed, by 2013 under successor Pace little of the early city lines remained. In Elgin, by contrast, most streetcar lines are now part of longer bus routes.

Elgin-Aurora interurban line
The interurban line left Elgin going south on State Street (Route 31), past the State Hospital (a.k.a. Asylum)(mile 1.8), then down the side of LaFox Street through Clintonville/South Elgin (mile 3.1). Curving east onto private right of way the line went through the freight interchange at Coleman (mile 4.5), across the river on its own bridge, and continued south to an intersection with Fifth Avenue in St. Charles. Street running started there, south to Main Street, then west across the river to Third Street, and south again into Geneva on Anderson Boulevard. At State Street the line turned east and went to Third Street (Chicago Junction, mile 11.6), where it turned south, then east, jogged south on Route 31, then onto private right of way between Route 31 and the river. A mile further south the line returned to Route 31, Batavia Avenue, street running through Batavia (mile 14.6), then on the east shoulder through North Aurora to the Aurora city limits. In Aurora the interurban used the Lake Street streetcar line on to the terminal.

In 2013 Pace Route 801 Goes from Elgin to Geneva, although largely on a more western alignment. From Geneva to Aurora Pace Route 802 follows the original interurban line very closely.

Rolling stock 
By 1900 most Fox River area lines shared management, city car orders were often divided between Aurora and Elgin. Lists include AE&FRE, predecessors EA&S and AE&C, as well as city systems in both Aurora and Elgin.

Cars used in interurban service 
Interurban cars were double trucked with heavier construction than city cars. 
Car 304 has been preserved and operates at the Fox River Trolley Museum (its original line)

Cars used in both city and interurban service 
Some double trucked cars were used in both city and interurban service.

City Cars 
Most city cars were single trucked “Birney” style, although a few double trucked cars were used. On arrival cars 48, 50-97, bought by AE&FRE, replaced most older cars.

Connecting lines 
In 1920 the AE&C Fox Valley Division connected with four radiating interurbans, all were closed by 1937.

Elgin & Belvidere 
With 9 passenger and 2 express cars they scheduled 19 trains each way with an hourly headway. Opened in 1907, it was the last to be closed to passenger service, in 1930.

Chicago, Aurora & DeKalb 
Opened in 1905 with light steam equipment, it was electrified by 1910, and closed in 1923.

Fox & Illinois Union 
The Fox and Illinois Union Railway left Yorkville (where it also connected with the C.B.&Q) and ran  straight south through Newark to Morris. Opened in 1914, two passenger cars ran 5 trains each way in a day. Grain was the major part of its freight traffic. Passenger service ended in 1924 but freight, converted to gas-electric in 1931, continued until 1937.

Aurora, Plainfield, & Joliet 
Eight passenger cars operated 17 trains each way in a day, and 3 streetcars provided local service in Joliet. First opened in 1903, it was converted to 5 Pierce-Arrow buses in 1924.

Notes

Footnotes

References

External links
 Illinois Trolleys @ Don's Rail Photos covers all lines
 Aurora, Plainfield, & Joliet @ Shore Line Interurban Historical Society
 Chicago, Aurora & Dekalb @ Shore Line Interurban Historical Society
 Fox & Illinois Union @ Abandoned Rails
 Fox River Trolley Museum operates on ex-AE&FRE track
 Illinois Railway Museum owns car 306
 Northern Ohio Railway Museum owns car 303
 Carpentersville Railroad Relic found in Suburban Cleveland

Interurban railways in Illinois
Defunct Illinois railroads
Defunct public transport operators in the United States
Streetcars in Illinois
Electric railways in Illinois
600 V DC railway electrification